XHWU-FM is a radio station on 96.9 FM in Matehuala, San Luis Potosí. It carries a grupera format known as La Poderosa.

History
XEWU-AM 1400 received its concession on November 26, 1971. In 1998, it was authorized to move to 1150 kHz with 500 watts, but it did not do so until toward the end of its life on AM.

XEWU received approval to migrate to FM in 2011.

References

Radio stations in San Luis Potosí